Laura Felicia Matusevich is an Argentine mathematician.

Birth and Education
Matusevich was born in Córdoba, Argentina, and earned her undergraduate degree from the Universidad Nacional de Córdoba. She earned her PhD from the University of California, Berkeley in 2002.

Career
From 2003 until 2004 Matusevich was a Benjamin Peirce Assistant Professor at Harvard University. From 2004 until 2006 she was a tenure-track assistant professor at the University of Pennsylvania. In 2005, she began as a tenure-track assistant professor at Texas A&M University, where she became a tenure-track associate professor in 2009. She became a full professor there in 2017.

Publications
Matusevich has published 34 research articles as of the 16th of March 2022.

Recognition
Matusevich is the recipient of multiple awards and honors, having been an Alfred P. Sloan Research Fellow, a NSF Postdoctoral Fellow, and an Antorchas Fellow (one of 25 people awarded this nationwide in Argentina), among others.

References

Living people
Argentine mathematicians
Argentine women mathematicians
National University of Córdoba alumni
University of California, Berkeley alumni
Women mathematicians
Year of birth missing (living people)